Ian Cameron Mercer (born 10 July 1961) is an English actor. He is known for playing Gary Mallett in the ITV soap opera Coronation Street from 1995 to 2000, having previously appeared in 1987 as Pete Jackson. His other television credits include Brookside (1982–83), Cracker (1993), and The Street (2007).

Career
Mercer was born in Oldham, Lancashire. On leaving school, Mercer trained as an electrical engineer but decided to become an actor when he became an assistant stage manager at the Oldham Coliseum in 1979. His first television appearance was as Mile in Starting Out (1982), a series made by ATV for schools and written by Grazyna Monvid.

Mercer went on to work in such stage productions as Bent, Spend Spend Spend, Saturday Night, Sunday Morning, Billy Liar, Stop The Children's Laughter, Welcome Home, Romeo and Juliet, The Fancy Man, The York Realist, Beauty and the Beast and Revengers Tragedy.

His television and film acting credits include leading roles as a butcher in Blue Money (1985), Coronation Street (as Gary Mallett and in 1987, Pete Jackson), Shackleton (with Kenneth Branagh), Heartbeat, The Monocled Mutineer, A Touch of Frost, Cracker, Common As Muck, Peak Practice, New Tricks and Master and Commander: The Far Side of the World (with Russell Crowe). In 2009 he appeared in an episode of Doctors and two episodes of Waking the Dead. He appeared as Blackbeard's chief zombie henchman in Pirates of the Caribbean: On Stranger Tides. During August and September 2015 he returned to Doctors playing the recurring role of Andy Weston in an ongoing sub-plot.

In 2007, he completed three years of study at Northumbria University, gaining a degree in English and Art History. He lives in Northumberland with his two daughters, Scarlett Rae (1997) and Carmine Mae (2000).

In 2018, Mercer appeared in the Mike Leigh film, Peterloo, playing the "buffoonish" Dr Healey.

In May 2011, he was convicted of benefit fraud, having falsely claimed £2,300 in council tax benefit despite being in work at the time. He was fined £165 with a £15 victim surcharge and £100 costs.

Film

Television

Theatre

References

External links

Mercer on Corrie.net
Mercer on tv.com
Interview with Mercer
Mercer on Filmbug.com

1961 births
English male film actors
English male soap opera actors
Living people
Male actors from Oldham
20th-century English male actors
21st-century English male actors
Alumni of Northumbria University
English male stage actors